From 1929 to 1931,  Metro-Goldwyn-Mayer  produced a series of nine short comedy films called All Barkie Dogville Comedies, sometimes known as the "barkies" (in a parody of "talkies"). The actors in these films were trained dogs, dressed up to parody the performers in contemporary films. The dogs' dialogue in these early sound films was dubbed by actors and voice artists including Pete Smith.

The films were directed by Zion Myers and conceived and co-directed by Jules White. Both Myers and White later worked on The Three Stooges comedies.

Series titles
1929
College Hounds.....parody of college football films, such as MGM's Brown of Harvard (1926), featuring "Red Mange" (Red Grange)
Hot Dog.....parody of courtroom dramas, such as MGM's Madame X (1929), featuring "Clara Bone" (Clara Bow)

1930
Who Killed Rover? AKA The Dogville Murder Case.....parody of Philo Vance whodunits (here "Phido Vance"), such as Paramount's The Canary Murder Case (1929)
The Dogway Melody.....parody of all talking, all singing, all dancing early musicals, specifically MGM's The Broadway Melody (1929)
So Quiet on the Canine Front.....parody of World War I films, specifically Universal's All Quiet on the Western Front (1930)
The Big Dog House.....parody of prison films, specifically MGM's The Big House (1930)

1931
Love-Tails of Morocco.....parody of Foreign Legion films, such as Paramount's Morocco (1930)
The Two Barks Brothers.....parody of "brothers on the opposite side of the law" films, specifically MGM's Gentleman's Fate (1931)
Trader Hound.....parody of jungle adventure films, specifically MGM's Trader Horn (1931)

Home video
The complete series of Dogville Comedies has been released on DVD by Warner Bros. as part of its Warner Archive Collection.

References

American film series
Metro-Goldwyn-Mayer short films
American comedy short films